Kakhaber Zhvania is an amateur boxer from Georgia best known to qualify for the Olympics at welterweight.

At the Euro 2006 he won Bronze losing his semi to Spas Genov, at the 2007 World Championsahips he was defeated by eventual winner Demetrius Andrade.

At the first qualifier he was upset by Billy Joe Saunders but qualified at the second tournament.

External links
 2006 European Championships Results
 1st Olympic qualifier
 2nd qualifier

Male boxers from Georgia (country)
Welterweight boxers
Living people
Boxers at the 2008 Summer Olympics
Olympic boxers of Georgia (country)
Year of birth missing (living people)
21st-century people from Georgia (country)